William S. Bartlett Jr. served as President of the New Hampshire Senate from 1987 to 1990.

References

Presidents of the New Hampshire Senate
Year of birth missing (living people)
Living people
Place of birth missing (living people)